Hal Millar (June 10, 1913 – August 12, 1991) was an American special effects artist. He was nominated for an Academy Award in the category Best Visual Effects for the film Ice Station Zebra. Millar was also a special effects artist for the 1939 film The Wizard of Oz.

Selected filmography 
 The Wizard of Oz (1939)
 Ice Station Zebra (1968; co-nominated with Joseph McMillan Johnson)

References

External links 

1913 births
1991 deaths
People from Los Angeles
Special effects people